Ananus ben Ananus (Hebrew:  Hanan ben Hanan Greek:  "Ananos son of Ananos" var: Ananias,  or ), d. 68 CE, was a Herodian-era High Priest of Israel in Jerusalem, Iudaea Province. He was the High Priest who ordered the execution by stoning of James, the brother of Jesus (James the Just), according to the surviving manuscripts of The Antiquities of the Jews. A delegation sent by citizens upset over the perceived breach of justice met Albinus before he reached Judea, and Albinus responded with a letter informing Ananus that it was illegal to convene the Sanhedrin without Albinus' permission and threatening to punish the priest. Ananus was therefore deposed by King Herod Agrippa II before Albinus's arrival  and replaced with Jesus ben Damneus.

Ananus was one of the main leaders of the Great Revolt of Judea, which erupted in 66 CE. He was appointed as one of the heads of the Judean provisional government together with Joseph ben Gurion in late 66. In 68, Ananus was killed during the inter-rebel civil war in Jerusalem. Josephus in The Jewish War considered Ananus "unique in his love for liberty and an enthusiast for democracy" and as an "effective speaker, whose words carried weight with the people".

Great Priest

Josephus's account of the death of James as follows:

The current scholarly consensus is that this text is authentic.  Moreover, in comparison with Hegesippus's account of James's death in his Hypomnemata, scholars consider Josephus's to be the more historically reliable.

Head of Judean provisional government
After Ananus was deposed as high priest, he continued to exercise leadership. "Under the guidance of former high priest Ananus ben Ananus, they (the Sanhedrin) exhorted the populace for support against the radical priestly Zealots, as these 'persuaded those who officiated in the Temple sacrifices to accept no gift or services from a foreigner' (BJ II, 409-414)." Later, he marshaled recruits to fight the Zealots, resulting in the Zealot Temple Siege. While commanding the Jews during the siege, Ananus was killed by the Idumeans.

References

Sources

External links
  Has a brief mention of Ananus ben Ananus at the end.

1st-century High Priests of Israel
68 deaths
Year of birth unknown